The Everest Peace Project (malayalam:  is an organization based in the United States that promotes peace, teamwork and cultural understanding by climbing some of the highest peaks in the world by a team of individuals from various faiths and cultures.

Climbs
 In 2004 the Everest Peace Project climbed Mount Shasta to celebrate the United Nations International Day of Peace.
 In 2005 the Everest Peace Project climbed Mount Kilimanjaro.
 In 2006 the Everest Peace Project climbed Mount Everest on May 18; the summit was reached by a trio composed of two Israelis (Dudu Yifrah and Micha Yaniv) and a Palestinian (Ali Bushnaq); Yifrah unfolded a sewn together Israeli–Palestinian flag on the summit of Everest.  The climb is the main focus of the documentary film Everest: A Climb for Peace.   Everest: A Climb for Peace is a documentary about the 2006 climb, and is narrated by Orlando Bloom. The documentary has been hailed as a "tremendous achievement" by the Dalai Lama and has received his endorsement.

References

External links

 Official website

Peace organizations based in the United States